Nowa Wieś Kącka  is a village in the administrative district of Gmina Kąty Wrocławskie, within Wrocław County, Lower Silesian Voivodeship, in south-western Poland. Prior to 1945 it was in Germany.

The village has a population of 280.

Monuments 
 Medieval stone cross (probably conciliation cross)
  Neogothic wayside shrine from 1875

References

Villages in Wrocław County